The , was an earth-fill embankment dam in Sukagawa City, Fukushima Prefecture, Japan. Construction on the dam commenced in 1937 and it was completed in 1949 after construction was halted due to World War II. The dam's primary purpose was irrigation. It failed on 11 March 2011 after the 2011 Tōhoku earthquake.

Failure
 
On 11 March 2011, the dam failed 20 to 25 minutes after the Tōhoku earthquake as the nearly full reservoir overtopped the dam's crest. Locals reported hearing a loud burst before seeing a flood. The flood washed away five houses while damaging others, disabling a bridge and blocked roads with debris. Eight people were missing and four bodies were discovered after searches began at dawn. The failure of  the earth-fill  dam  at  the Fujinuma reservoir  in Fukushima  prefecture resulted  in eight deaths in  a  village. 

On 12 March, 252 dams were inspected and seven dams were found to be damaged. Six embankment dams had shallow cracking on their crests and the reservoir at one concrete gravity dam had a slight slope failure. Four dams, including the Fujinuma, were inaccessible and could not be inspected.

A preliminary survey of the dam and facilities conducted in April 2011 noted that the breach occurred at the tallest section of the dam. Within the dam's fill, there were layers of organic residual soil that in one area contained a tree stump. The residual soil was used as foundation and in layers as well – above alluvium. This suggests that the foundation for the dam was not prepared properly, according to the study. In addition, the reservoir's auxiliary dam suffered a severe slope failure on its upstream face while areas around the rim of the reservoir had mild slope failures or distress. It could not be confirmed whether the earthquake or a quick draining of the reservoir was the cause of this.

Design
The auxiliary dam helped the reservoir maintain it designed levels given the topography wouldn't allow the single main dam to do so. The dam was built by Shoji Kensetsu and operated by Ebana River Coastal Reclamation District.

Recovery
Reconstruction of the dam started in October 2013, and has been completed in April 2017.

See also
Dam failure

References

Dams in Fukushima Prefecture
Dam failures in Asia
2011 Tōhoku earthquake and tsunami
Dams completed in 1949
Man-made disasters in Japan
Buildings damaged by the 2011 Tōhoku earthquake and tsunami